Noë Bloch (1875-1937) was a Russian-born film producer. He was born as Noé Markowitsch Bloch to a Jewish family in St. Petersburg in the Russian Empire. After emigrating from Russia following the Russian Revolution, Bloch established himself as a producer in Germany and in France where he often worked with other Russian exiles at Albatros Film.

Selected filmography
 The Loves of Casanova (1927)
 Hurrah! I Live! (1928)
 Dolly Gets Ahead (1930)
 The Unknown Singer (1931)
 No More Love (1931)
 Calais-Dover (1931)
 In the Employ of the Secret Service (1931)

References

Bibliography 
 Crisp, C.G. The Classic French Cinema, 1930-1960. Indiana University Press, 1993.

External links 
 

1875 births
1937 deaths
French film producers
20th-century Russian Jews
People who emigrated to escape Bolshevism
Emigrants from the Russian Empire to France